Finestrat is a municipality in the comarca of Marina Baixa, Alicante in the Valencian Community, Spain.

Geography
Accessed by road via the motorway AP-7 and exit 65-A, from where a local road connects to the town. Finestrat can also be accessed directly from the N-332. The beach of Cala de Finestrat is bordered by the towns of La Vila Joiosa to the southwest and Benidorm to the northeast. The municipality includes the mountain Puig Campana, whose summit reaches .

Gallery

References

External links
  

Municipalities in the Province of Alicante
Marina Baixa